Eudonia exterminata is a moth in the family Crambidae. It was described by Edward Meyrick in 1929. It is found on Rapa Iti in French Polynesia.

References

Moths described in 1929
Eudonia

External Links
 Eudonia exterminata (Meyrick, 1929)